Stockton Airport may refer to:

 Stockton Metropolitan Airport in Stockton, California, United States (FAA: SCK)
 Stockton Municipal Airport (Kansas) in Stockton, Kansas, United States (FAA: 0S2)
 Stockton Municipal Airport (Missouri) in Stockton, Missouri, United States (FAA: MO3)